Erwin Schrödinger (1887–1961) was an Austrian physicist and one of the fathers of quantum mechanics.

Schrödinger may also refer to:

Physics
Schrödinger's cat, a thought experiment devised by Schrödinger that illustrates what he saw as the problem of the Copenhagen interpretation of quantum mechanics applied to everyday objects
Schrödinger equation, an equation formulated by Schrödinger that describes how the quantum state of a physical system changes in time
Schrödinger field, a quantum field which obeys the Schrödinger equation
Schrödinger group, the symmetry group of the free particle Schrödinger equation
Schrödinger method, a method used to solve some problems of distribution and occupancy
Schrödinger picture, a formulation of quantum mechanics in which the state vectors evolve in time, but the operators (observables and others) are constant

Astronomy
Schrödinger (crater), a lunar impact crater
Vallis Schrödinger, a long, nearly linear valley that lies on the far side of the Moon
13092 Schrödinger, a main belt asteroid

Other
Schrödinger, an implementation of Dirac (video compression format)
Schrödinger (company), a scientific software company
Schrödinger (Hellsing), a fictional character in the Hellsing manga series by Kouta Hirano